The Golden Guardians (GG) are an American esports organization owned by the Golden State Warriors. The organization was one of four that joined the League of Legends Championship Series (LCS) in 2018 after the league began franchising, the others being 100 Thieves, Clutch Gaming and OpTic Gaming. On December 18, 2019, the Golden Guardians announced their expansion into the professional scenes of Apex Legends, Teamfight Tactics and World of Warcraft.

Super Smash Bros. Melee player Zain "Zain" Naghmi and Teamfight Tactics player David "DogDog" Caero were signed by the Golden Guardians on February 6, 2020. On April 2, 2021, the organization announced the signings of Super Smash Bros. Melee player Edgard "n0ne" L. Sheleby, inactive player and streamer Kevin "PPMD" Nanney and commentator Kris "Toph" Aldenderfer.

League of Legends

LCS team

History 

The Golden Guardians finalized their roster for the 2018 NA LCS Spring Split on December 13, 2017, signing top laner Samson "Lourlo" Jackson, jungler Juan "Contractz" Arturo Garcia, mid laner Hai "Hai" Du Lam, bot laner Matthew "Deftly" Chen and support Matthew "Matt" Elento, with Choi "Locodoco" Yoon-seop as head coach for the team. On February 4, 2018, Locodoco was fired after making inappropriate remarks towards a female member of Riot Games' esports staff. The final decision was made by the Golden State Warriors, the parent company of the Golden Guardians, who cited their strict zero tolerance policy. Assistant coach Tyler Perron was subsequently promoted to interim head coach to fill the vacant position. The team finished the regular season of the 2018 NA LCS Spring Split in tenth place with a 4–14 record.

On April 23, 2018, the Golden Guardians acquired mid laner Young-min "Mickey" Son from Team Liquid, in preparation for the 2018 NA LCS Summer Split. Shortly afterwards, Hai announced his retirement from competitive play for the second time and left the team.

The Golden Guardians ended the 2018 NA LCS Summer Split in tenth place, with a 5–13 record, becoming the first team in the league's history to finish last two splits in a row.

In preparation for the 2019 LCS Spring Split (which had recently renamed to exclude "NA" from its title), the Golden Guardians acquired Kevin "Hauntzer" Yarnell and Kim "Olleh" Joo-sung from Team SoloMid and Team Liquid respectively. Veteran player Henrik "Froggen" Hansen later joined the team to complete the roster. The Golden Guardians also hired Nick "Inero" Smith as the Golden Guardians' new head coach and Danan Flander, former Cloud9 senior general manager, as the team's first general manager.

Despite a disappointing start to the 2019 LCS Spring Split, the Golden Guardians managed to end the regular season in fifth place after losing a tiebreaker match to FlyQuest, with a 9–9 record. This secured the team their first appearance in playoffs, where they narrowly lost 2–3 to FlyQuest in the quarterfinals. During the first half of the summer split the Golden Guardians kept the same starting lineup from the spring split, but later opted to promote bot laner Victor "FBI" Huang and support Choi "Huhi" Jae-hyun from the academy team. Deftly was later traded to Cloud9 Academy for Yuri "Keith" Jew. The Golden Guardians ended the summer split tied for sixth with 100 Thieves and OpTic Gaming. After losing their tiebreaker match to OpTic Gaming, the Golden Guardians were locked out of playoffs.

Current roster

Tournament results

Academy team

Current roster

Tournament results

Super Smash Bros. Melee

History 
Super Smash Bros. Melee player Zain "Zain" Naghmi was signed by the Golden Guardians on February 6, 2020. During 2020, Zain has won Pound Online, the Ludwig Ahgren Championship Series 2, and Smash Summit 10, all three of which took place online due to the COVID-19 pandemic. On June 20, 2020, Golden Guardians hosted "The Octagon", a one-night showcase of some of Melee's top players competing in a first-to-five wins matchup with the main event being Zain vs Joseph "Mang0" Manuel Marquez, which Zain won 5–2.

On April 2, 2021, the organization announced the signings of Super Smash Bros. Melee player Edgard "n0ne" L. Sheleby, inactive player and streamer Kevin "PPMD" Nanney and commentator Kris "Toph" Aldenderfer.

Zain was ranked the number one player in the world in 2022.

Current roster

References

External links 
 

2017 establishments in California
Fighting game player sponsors
Super Smash Bros. player sponsors
Esports teams established in 2017
Esports teams based in the United States
League of Legends Championship Series teams